Fanerny Zavod is a rural locality (a settlement) in Nikolskoye Rural Settlement, Kaduysky District, Vologda Oblast, Russia. The population was 1 as of 2002. There are 13 streets.

Geography 
Fanerny Zavod is located 13 km northeast of Kaduy (the district's administrative centre) by road. Zhornovets is the nearest rural locality.

References 

Rural localities in Kaduysky District